Jasir Fadil Asani (born 19 May 1995) is an Albanian professional footballer who plays as a winger for K League 1 club Gwangju FC and the Albania national team.

Club career

Early life and career
Jasir Asani was born in Skopje to Albanian parents. Asani begun his professional career with Vardar, making his debut on 25 August 2013 by coming on in the last minutes of a 2–0 away defeat to Turnovo.

Partizani
Asani scored a hat-trick on 14 October 2017 for Partizani B against Sopoti to give his side the 4–1 victory.

He made his professional debut on 29 October 2017 with Partizani senior squad in the matchday 8 against Flamurtari by coming on as a substitute in the 81st minute in place of Milan Basrak.

Asani scored his first goals for Partizani later on 4 February 2018 in the 2–1 home win over Kamza, allowing the team to overtake them in the standing.

Gwangju FC
On 28 December 2022, Asani joined K League 1 side Gwangju FC on a permanent deal.

On 18 March 2023, he scored a hat-trick in a 5–0 league win over Incheon United.

International career
Having played for Macedonian youth level teams, Asani received the Albanian citizenship on 18 March 2016 to switch for Albania national under-21 football team. 

He played his first international match for under-21 side on 22 January 2016 by netting his side's only goal in the 1–1 draw versus Saudi Arabia. 

In March 2023, he received his first call-up to the Albanian senior national team for the UEFA Euro 2024 qualifying match against Poland.

Career statistics

Club

References

External links

1995 births
Living people
Footballers from Skopje
Albanian footballers
Albanian expatriate footballers
Association football midfielders
Association football forwards
Kategoria e Dytë players
Kategoria Superiore players
Macedonian First Football League players
Allsvenskan players
Nemzeti Bajnokság I players
K League 1 players
FK Shkupi players
FK Vardar players
FK Pobeda players
FK Partizani Tirana players
AIK Fotboll players
Kisvárda FC players
Gwangju FC players
North Macedonia youth international footballers
North Macedonia under-21 international footballers
Albania youth international footballers
Albania under-21 international footballers
Albanian footballers from North Macedonia
Albanian expatriate sportspeople in Sweden
Expatriate footballers in Sweden
Albanian expatriate sportspeople in Hungary
Expatriate footballers in Hungary
Albanian expatriate sportspeople in South Korea
Expatriate footballers in South Korea